Ragnhild Valle Dahl (born 2 January 1998) is a Norwegian female handballer who plays for Vipers Kristiansand and the Norwegian national team.

She also represented Norway in the 2017 Women's Junior European Handball Championship, placing 7th, and in the 2016 Women's Youth World Handball Championship, placing 4th.

In February it was revealed that Valle Dahl had signed a contract with Norwegian champions Vipers Kristiansand, for the upcoming 2019/20-season.

She was also a part of Norway's 28-squad for the 2019 World Women's Handball Championship and Norways 35-squad for the 2020 European Women's Handball Championship

Achievements
European Championship
Gold Medalist: 2022
Junior World Championship: 
Silver Medalist: 2018
EHF Champions League:
Winner: 2020/2021, 2021/2022
Norwegian League:
Winner: 2019/2020, 2020/2021, 2021/2022
Norwegian Cup:
Winner: 2019, 2020, 2021, 2022/23

Individual awards
 All-Star Left Back of Eliteserien: 2018/2019
 Topscorer of Eliteserien 2018/2019: (148 goals)

References

1998 births
Living people
Norwegian female handball players